The Samalá is a river in southwestern Guatemala. Its sources are in the Sierra Madre, Valle De Écija range, in the departments of Quetzaltenango and Totonicapán. From there it flows down, past the towns San Carlos Sija in the Valle De Écija, Quetzaltenango, San Cristóbal Totonicapán, Quetzaltenango, El Palmar and Zunil, through the coastal plains of Retalhuleu into the Pacific Ocean.

Its proximity to the active Santa Maria and Santiaguito volcano complex, with its recurring lava and lahars flows, leads to a heightened risk of serious flooding.

External links

References

Rivers of Guatemala
Geography of the Totonicapán Department
Geography of the Quetzaltenango Department
Geography of the Retalhuleu Department